769 Tatjana is a minor planet orbiting the Sun. The body was named such after Tatiana Larina, protagonist of Alexander Pushkin's poem "Eugene Onegin". It's possible that the name was suggested by the provisional designation of the asteroid, 1913 TA, but unlike bodies named by Wolf, Knopff and Metcalf in the years 1905–1909, there's no naming pattern to support this.

References

External links 
 Discovery Circumstances: Numbered Minor Planets
 
 

000769
Discoveries by Grigory Neujmin
Named minor planets
19131006